The Neijiang railway station is a railway station of the Chengdu–Chongqing Railway. The station is located in  Neijiang, Sichuan province.

It is one of two stations in Neijiang, the other being Neijiang North on the Chengdu–Chongqing intercity railway.

See also
Chengdu–Chongqing Railway

Stations on the Chengdu–Chongqing Railway
Railway stations in Sichuan
Railway stations in China opened in 1953